Jackassworld.com: 24 Hour Takeover was a 24-hour live TV special from February 23 to 24, 2008, featuring many stars of the MTV show and film franchise Jackass.

Like its predecessors 24 Hours of Foo, 24 Hours of Love, and 2007's Human Giant 24 Hour Takeover, the group took over the MTV studios for a 24-hour period on MTV. The takeover coincided with the launch of Jackassworld.com.

About the broadcast 
Beginning at noon ET on Saturday, February 23, 2008 Johnny Knoxville, Bam Margera, Wee Man, Chris Pontius, Steve-O, Dave England, Preston Lacy, and Ehren McGhehey "ran" MTV for 24 hours, broadcasting their favorite stunts, taking questions, performing new skits and stunts along with other banter and pranks. Jackass cast member Ryan Dunn did not participate, as he was suffering from depression at the time. However, archival footage of Dunn is shown. Also appearing were Mick Page and Sam Macaroni as "The Preston Lacy players", with Macaroni going on to rap with Steve-O live for Yo! MTV Raps, with a Beavis and Butt-Head clip showing the duo making fun of Steve-O's newest rap single beforehand. Also shown was a one-hour tribute to stunt man Evel Knievel, who died three months before. This event was re-broadcast on MTV2 in its entirety on March 1 and 2.

Halfway through the broadcast, Steve-O was kicked out of the MTV studios on the request of executives for his behavior and intoxication. He was allowed back in the studio a few hours later.

International broadcast 
MTV Asia aired the highlights of Jackassworld.com: 24 Hour Takeover on May 21, 2014.

See also 
 24 Hours of Foo
 24 Hours of Love
 Human Giant

References

External links 

MTV original programming
2000s American television series
Jackass (TV series)